Regalbuto (Latin: Ameselum; Sicilian: Regarbutu) is a comune in the province of Enna,  Sicily, southern Italy.

There is an annual cattle fair held in the month of August.

History
Regalbuto may be the ancient town of Amaselos, which was named by the Greek and Sicilian historian Diodorus Siculus in his Bibliotheca historica (Historical Library) writings.

The name Regalbuto derives from the Arab term Rahal Abbud, "Abbud's farmhouse". Discoveries at the site include the old Saracen quarter.

Around 1200, the inhabitants of the nearby town of Centuripe, who rebelled against the Swabian dynasty whom Regalbuto had been faithful to, destroyed Regalbuto. Years later, King Manfred had the town rebuilt at its present site.

In 1860, a number of members of parliament met in Regalbuto with Garibaldi to discuss a truce during the Campaign of 1860.

The town was never subject to fiscal taxes, and a free magistracy elected by the king and the archbishops of Messina governed it. The town was severely damaged during World War II, and on August 3, 1943 the Pionier Battalion of Hermann Göring Panzer Division, supported by tanks and self-propelled guns was forced to cede the town, after four days of bitter fighting by the 1st Infantry Brigade of 1st Canadian Infantry Division. The current inhabited center was reconstructed only recently.

Main sights

 Chiesa Madre San Basilio (Mother Church of Saint Basil) dedicated to Saint Basil, which was built on the site of a 16th-century building and preserving a luxurious 10 meter altar dedicated to Saint Vitus. It has a Baroque façade with a pyramid shaped bell tower.
 Santa Maria della Croce: 15th-century church with a  Baroque staircase 
 San Giovanni:18th-century church with a large bell loggia
Town hall (Palazzo Municipale, 18th century)
Remains of the 13th-century castle:
Palazzo Citelli-Fascaro (17th century)
Palazzo Falcone (17th century)
Palazzo Campagnini in Liberty Style
Palazzo Carchiolo

In the city environs are sites of naturalistic interest like the Pozzillo Lake district, one of Europe's largest man-made lakes, fed by the Salso River. Mountains include the Monte Mascari, north of the lake, and, also in the lake vicinity, the Monte Salici.

Economy

The economy is based on agriculture, including cereals, citrus, and olives. Animal husbandry includes cattle, sheep, and goats.

References

Municipalities of the Province of Enna
13th-century disestablishments in Italy